Lloyd Hill is an ice-covered hill  rising to 335 m in the southwest of Dryanovo Heights, Greenwich Island in the South Shetland Islands, Antarctica.  The hill surmounts Teteven Glacier to the north and Murgash Glacier to the southeast.

The name derives from 'Lloyd's Land', an early name for Greenwich Island.

Location

See also
 Breznik Heights
 Greenwich Island

Maps
 L.L. Ivanov et al. Antarctica: Livingston Island and Greenwich Island, South Shetland Islands. Scale 1:100000 topographic map. Sofia: Antarctic Place-names Commission of Bulgaria, 2005.
 L.L. Ivanov. Antarctica: Livingston Island and Greenwich, Robert, Snow and Smith Islands. Scale 1:120000 topographic map.  Troyan: Manfred Wörner Foundation, 2009.

References
 SCAR Composite Antarctic Gazetteer.

Hills of Greenwich Island